Sadpur is a village in Muzaffarnagar district of Uttar Pradesh in northern India. It is located at 29.33° N 77.85° E. It has an average elevation of 232 metres (761 feet). Its population is around 4,000.

Primary School Sadpur is located in the village. It is one of the few best government schools in the Muzaffarnagar district in Uttar Pradesh.

Villages in Muzaffarnagar district